All Aboard may refer to:

Music 
 All Aboard! (John Denver album), 1997
 All Aboard (Side Effect album), 1982
 All Aboard: A Tribute to Johnny Cash, tribute album to Johnny Cash, 2008
 All Aboard, an unreleased album by Locomotiv GT
 "All Aboard" (Romeo Santos song), 2012
 "All Aboard", a song by Bassjackers vs D'Angello & Francis, 2017
 "All Aboard", a song by the Lucky Monkeys, 1990

Other uses
 All Aboard (TV series), an Irish children's television series which premiered in 2018
 All Aboard (1917 film), a 1917 comedy short starring Harold Lloyd
 All Aboard (1927 film), a 1927 film starring Johnny Hines
 All Aboard! Rosie's Family Cruise, a 2006 American documentary film
 All Aboard! 20th Century American Trains, a United States Postal Service stamp set
 Brightline, United States Train operator previously known as All Aboard Florida
 All Aboard, the slogan for Eurovision Song Contest 2018

See also 
 All a Bir-r-r-rd, a 1949 Looney Tunes cartoon